Hans Gruber (11 July 1925 –  6 August 2001) was a Canadian conductor of Austrian birth.

Born in Vienna, Gruber became a naturalised Canadian citizen in 1944. He entered The Royal Conservatory of Music in 1939 where he was a conducting student of Allard de Ridder. He also studied conducting in the summers at the Tanglewood Music Center from 1943-1947 with such teachers as Fritz Mahler, Leonard Bernstein, and Pierre Monteux. In 1948 he succeeded Melvin Knudsen as the conductor of the Victoria Symphony, a post he held until 1963. He also served on the music faculty of the University of Toronto for several years where he notably conducted the school's symphony orchestra.

References

1925 births
2001 deaths
Male conductors (music)
The Royal Conservatory of Music alumni
Academic staff of the University of Toronto
20th-century Canadian conductors (music)
20th-century Canadian male musicians
Austrian emigrants to Canada